is a passenger railway station located in the city of Takamatsu, Kagawa, Japan.  It is operated by the private transportation company Takamatsu-Kotohira Electric Railroad (Kotoden) and is designated station "S02".

Lines
Matsushima-Nichome Station is a station of the Kotoden Shido Line and is located 1.2 km from the opposing terminus of the line at Kawaramachi Station].

Layout
The station consists of two opposed side platforms serving two tracks. There is no station building. A level crossing connects the two platforms together. The station is unmanned.

Platforms

Adjacent stations

History
The station was moved 100 meters towards Kawaramachi Station in 1971, and was also renamed to the current name. In 1996, a passing loop was built at the station.

Passenger statistics

Surrounding area
Takamatsu Prison
Takamatsu Municipal Takamatsu Daiichi Elementary School/Junior High School
Takamatsu Central High School

See also
 List of railway stations in Japan

References

External links

  

Stations of Takamatsu-Kotohira Electric Railroad
Railway stations opened in 1911
Railway stations in Takamatsu